Growth hormone receptor is a protein that in humans is encoded by the GHR gene. GHR orthologs have been identified in most mammals.

Structure 
Growth hormone receptor (GHR) is a transmembrane protein consisting of 620 amino acids. The receptor is part of the Type I cytokine receptor family of receptors. GHR exists in two forms as a full length membrane-bound receptor and as a soluble GH binding protein (GHBP). GHR contains two fibronectin type III β domains in its extracellular domain, whereas the intracellular domain contains tyrosine Kinase JAK2 binding sites for SH2 proteins. JAK2 is the primary signal transducer for growth hormone.

Function 

This gene encodes a protein that is a transmembrane receptor for growth hormone. Binding of growth hormone to the receptor leads to reorientation of a pre-assembled receptor dimer dimerization (the receptor may however also exist as monomers on the cell surface ) and the activation of an intra- and intercellular signal transduction pathway leading to growth. A common alternate allele of this gene, called GHRd3, lacks exon three and has been well characterized. Mutations in this gene have been associated with Laron syndrome, also known as the growth hormone insensitivity syndrome (GHIS), a disorder characterized by short stature (proportional dwarfism). Other splice variants, including one encoding a soluble form of the protein (GHRtr), have been observed but have not been thoroughly characterized. Laron mice (that is mice genetically engineered to carry defective Ghr), have a dramatic reduction in body mass (only reaching 50% of the weight of normal siblings), and also show a ~40% increase in lifespan.

Interactions 

Growth hormone receptor has been shown to interact with SGTA, PTPN11, Janus kinase 2, Suppressor of cytokine signaling 1 and CISH.

Evolution
The GHR gene is used in animals as a nuclear DNA phylogenetic marker. The exon 10 has first been experienced to explore the phylogeny of the major groups of Rodentia.
GHR has also proven useful at lower taxonomic levels, e.g., in octodontoid, arvicoline, muroid, murine, and peromyscine  rodents, in arctoid  and felid carnivores, and in dermopterans.
Note that the GHR intron 9 has also been used to investigate the mustelid and hyaenid  carnivores phylogenetics.

Antagonists
Growth hormone receptor antagonists such as pegvisomant (trade name Somavert) are used in the treatment of acromegaly. They are used if the tumor of the pituitary gland causing the acromegaly cannot be controlled with surgery or radiation, and the use of somatostatin analogues is unsuccessful. Pegvisomant is delivered as a powder that is mixed with water and injected under the skin.

See also 
 Hypothalamic–pituitary–somatic axis

References

External links 
 
 Illustration at nih.gov
 Overview
 Growth Hormone Receptor : Molecule of the Month by Shuchismita Dutta and David Goodsell (April 2004)
 PDBe-KB provides an overview of all the structure information available in the PDB for Human Growth hormone receptor